Protistolophus spangleri is a species of water scavenger beetles in the family Hydrophilidae and the only species in the genus Protistolophus. Protistolophus spangleri was described as a new species and genus by Andrew E.Z. Short in 2010. The species is known only from Venezuela.

References

Hydrophilinae